Seventeen Mile River is a stream in the U.S. state of Georgia. It is a tributary to the Satilla River.

Seventeen Mile River most likely was so named on account of its length. Variant names are "Seventeen Mile Creek" and "Seventeenmile Creek".

References

Rivers of Georgia (U.S. state)
Rivers of Atkinson County, Georgia
Rivers of Coffee County, Georgia
Rivers of Irwin County, Georgia
Rivers of Ware County, Georgia